Theodore Bernard Sachs (May 2, 1868 – April 2, 1916) was an American physician and lawyer. He was elected president of the National Tuberculosis Association at the Eleventh Annual Meeting held in Seattle, Washington, in June, 1915. But his death on April 2, 1916 prevented his serving his full term. He had already served the Association as vice-president from 1913 to 1914.

Early years
Born in Dinaberg, Russia, May 2, 1868, the son of Bernard and Sophie Sachs, he was graduated from the Kherson High School.  In 1891, he received his degree in law from the Odessa University. While at the University, he reported for military duty and was placed on the reserve list in 1887. His removal to America in 1891 was doubtless prompted by a winter's exile, imposed upon him and several fellow-students because of their participation in a debate which did not meet with the approval of the local authorities.

After his arrival in the U.S., Sachs determined to study medicine, and gave up his legal career to enter the University of Illinois College of Medicine, from which he graduated in 1895. After two years of work as an intern in the Michael Reese Hospital, he entered general practice, devoting himself particularly to diseases of the lungs.

Career
In 1901, Sachs was appointed instructor in internal medicine at his alma mater, and in 1903 he was appointed attending physician to Cook County Hospital. Even in the earlier days of his medical career, as a struggling young practitioner endeavoring to gain a foothold, he saw how conditions were with reference to tuberculosis in Chicago at that time, and he could not refrain from doing something to help. At no little sacrifice and expense, he personally made an investigation of the prevalence of tuberculosis in some of the crowded quarters of the city, particularly in the districts where the Jewish population was in evidence. These studies, among the first of their kind, gave Sachs considerable prominence at the Sixth International Congress on Tuberculosis in 1908, and won for him special honorable mention from the jury of awards.

Sachs was greatly interested in the Chicago Tuberculosis Institute, which he helped to call into life, and of which he remained one of the most active and representative workers. He served as president of the Institute from January, 1913, until his death. In the early morning of April 2, 1916, he committed suicide by taking an overdose of morphine because "I am simply weary. I cannot bear this longer. It has been too much."

He was one of the most ardent advocates of the routine examinations of employees of large establishments. It was largely due to Sachs' influence that Mrs. Keith Spalding donated the funds for the Edward Sanatorium at Naperville, of which institution he became the director and physician in chief. Besides his activities in the Edward Sanatorium, he was attached to the Chicago Winfield Sanatorium, the West Side Dispensary, and the Chicago Municipal Tuberculosis Sanitarium. Concerning his interest in the latter, Dr. Philip P. Jacobs says:

Of all the many activities in which he engaged, however, none claimed so large a share of Dr. Sachs' personality and skill as the Chicago Municipal Tuberculosis Sanitarium. In a very real sense the Sanitarium was and is Dr. Sachs. It breathes his personality and his genius from almost every ward and brick. Into it he put his very body and soul. He was active in the passage of the Glackin Law, which made the sanatorium possible. He was a prime mover in the monstrous referendum campaign when hundreds of thousands of people voted 'yes' for the municipal sanatorium. He was the chairman of the Building Committee which secured the site and conceived the sanatorium long before a brick or a stone had been laid, putting into this effort thousands of dollars' worth of time and sacrifice, and countless miles of travel to visit the best institutions that the world provided. Later he became president of the board and its chief administrative director. While the sanatorium was in construction he spent hours daily at no little sacrifice to his practice, so that the people of Chicago should have an institution which would be both of service for the purpose for which it was constructed and which would not squander one dollar of the people's money.

In the spring of 1915, a new administration came into office in the city of Chicago, which, it was universally admitted at the time, was responsible for Sachs' untimely death. He had made the Chicago Municipal Sanitarium an ideal institution, but the Thompson administration refused to reappoint him until practically forced to do so by the people of Chicago. Politics finally gained the upper hand, however, and Sachs was forced to resign; but even after his resignation, nefarious politics made life a burden for this brave pioneer who had unselfishly devoted the best years of his life to the welfare of the consumptive poor of the great city of Chicago.

In an article entitled "The Civic Martyrdom of Dr. Sachs," Dr. Graham Taylor, the distinguished social worker, says:

No altar of civic patriotism ever held a more loyal offering than that on which Dr. Theodore B. Sachs sacrificed himself in life and death to save Chicago's Municipal Tuberculosis Sanitarium from ruthless partisan spoilsmen. In truth, many altars and offerings seemed to unite in that one costly sacrifice. Such supreme devotion to a cause as the Jewish religious spirit can beget, such self-sacrifice as the Russian oppression of the Jew incites, such idealism as only the Orient inspires, such sensitivity as the heritage of suffering weaves into the very texture of the soul, such humanitarian achievements as are possible only in America—all combined to make the achieving life and the tragic death of Dr. Sachs profoundly impressive.

His achievements as a clinician and specialist in tuberculosis are equal to his attainments as a propagandist and administrator. He founded the Robert Koch Society for the Study of Tuberculosis, and read before that body a number of interesting and valuable papers on the various phases of tuberculosis science. A few months before his death (February, 1916) he was elected a fellow of the Institute of Medicine in Chicago. His devotion to high ideals, his passionate love for humanity, his integrity and faithfulness to all things which he undertook, are best shown in a passage from his letter of resignation from the Municipal Sanitarium Board, wherein he said:

My service to the Sanitarium during the last six years has been prompted by the earnest desire to give the best in me to this community in which I have resided during the last twenty-seven years. ... I have refused to betray the community that has given me confidence. I have great faith in the city of Chicago and its citizens. I have passed through ten months of continuous nightmare in trying to avert the politicalization of a great institution. But I find it impossible to continue. Single-handed at present I cannot fight a big political machine.

In this connection the following copy of a letter which Sachs received from his patients at the Edward Sanatorium a few months before his death is significant:

We the undersigned patients of the Edward Sanatorium wish to take this privilege of expressing our admiration for the stand you have taken in regard to politics in connection with the Municipal Sanitarium of Chicago—your untiring and unselfish interest in humanity. None of the grossly unjust criticisms of you by anyone who does not know you or your methods will have the slightest influence on us who have implicit confidence in your ability as a practitioner and as a man. The past records of a man who possesses your international reputation cannot be easily tossed aside.

The end came at the sanatorium of the Chicago Tuberculosis Institute in the quiet little town of Naperville. There, after his day's work in town, he sought rest all alone in the quiet of the library. And there they found him the next morning, at peace in his last sleep, which he had himself induced. The body of Sachs was interred on the grounds of the Naperville Sanatorium, and on the memorial tablet indicating the site, is the following inscription:

In Memory of DR. THEODORE B. SACHS, whose life was spent in disinterested efforts to relieve the condition of the unfortunate, never indifferent to the distress of others, he labored unselfishly and untiringly in their behalf, and this Sanatorium in which ground he sleeps is a monument to his unusual greatness of heart and singleness of purpose. He loved his neighbor as himself and was in truth a good Samaritan.

Over the portals of that other monument to Sachs' genius, the Chicago Municipal Tuberculosis Sanitarium, which had become a part of his very life, is the following inscription: "Conceived in boundless love of humanity and made possible by years of toil."

References

This article incorporates text from Sigard Adolphus Knopf's "A history of the National tuberculosis association: the anti-tuberculosis movement in the United States" (1922), now in the public domain.

1868 births
1916 suicides
American pulmonologists
American people of Russian-Jewish descent
University of Illinois alumni
University of Illinois faculty
Odesa University alumni
People from Naperville, Illinois
Suicides in Illinois
1916 deaths